The 1500 metres speed skating event was part of the speed skating at the 1948 Winter Olympics programme. The competition was held on Monday, 2 February 1948. Forty-five speed skaters from 14 nations competed.

Medalists

Records
These were the standing world and Olympic records (in minutes) prior to the 1948 Winter Olympics.

(*) The record was set in a high altitude venue (more than 1000 metres above sea level) and on naturally frozen ice.

All three medalists were faster than the standing Olympic record. Sverre Farstad set the new Olympic record with a time of 2:17.6 seconds.

Results

References

External links
Official Olympic Report
 

Speed skating at the 1948 Winter Olympics